Celeste Sánchez Romero (8 February 1990 – 21 February 2022) was a Mexican dental researcher and federal deputy from the Labor Party (PT) in the first six months of the LXV Legislature of the Mexican Congress. Prior to becoming a legislator, she was an academic researcher.

Education and research

Sánchez Romero graduated from the Universidad Juárez del Estado de Durango in 2013 with a degree in dentistry. She later became an adjunct faculty member of the Universidad de la República in Uruguay and had 47 scientific articles published in indexed publications. In 2020, she was designated a Level I researcher in the Sistema Nacional de Investigadores.

Political career

In 2021, she was elected to serve as a proportional representation federal deputy from the Labor Party out of the first electoral region (which includes Durango), taking the PT's only seat from that region. She served as secretary on the Science, Technology and Innovation Commission and also sat on the Health and Youth commissions. On the Health Commission, she was involved in debate over reforms to GMO labeling requirements.

Personal life and death

Sánchez Romero was found dead in her Durango home on 21 February 2022, at the age of 32. An autopsy revealed pulmonary aspiration to be the cause of death. That Friday, she had been in Durango to participate in a forum on proposed changes to laws governing the electricity sector. The Durango Attorney General's Office later announced that her death was a suicide by overdose, citing as evidence a suicide note and a syringe that had been found with her body.

She was replaced by her alternate, María de Jesús Paéz Guereca, in the Chamber of Deputies.

References

1990 births
2022 deaths
2022 suicides
Labor Party (Mexico) politicians
Deputies of the LXV Legislature of Mexico
Politicians from Durango
Women members of the Chamber of Deputies (Mexico)
21st-century Mexican women politicians
State University of Campinas alumni
Universidad Juárez del Estado de Durango alumni
Academic staff of the University of the Republic (Uruguay)
Mexican dentists
Mexican politicians who committed suicide
Members of the Chamber of Deputies (Mexico) for Durango